Šljivno may refer to:
 Lađevići (Bileća)
 Lađevići (Ilijaš)